Peripatopsidae is one of the two living velvet worm families.

Description
The Peripatopsidae exhibit relatively many characteristics that are perceived as original or "primitive" with respect to the Peripatidae. The species in this family have relatively few legs, ranging from 13 pairs (in Ooperipatellus nanus) to a maximum of 29 pairs (in Paraperipatus papuensis). Behind or between the last leg pair is the genital opening (gonopore). This family includes both oviparous genera (e.g., Ooperipatellus and Ooperipatus) and viviparous genera, which adopt various modes of supplying nourishment to their embryos, ranging from lecithotrophic ovoviviparity (with yolky eggs retained in their uteri, e.g., Peripatoides) to matrotrophic viviparity (with little or no yolk in the eggs retained in their uteri and nourishment supplied by the mother instead, e.g., Metaperipatus, Opisthopatus, Paraperipatus, Paropisthopatus, and Peripatopsis). The Peripatopsidae lack a placenta, however, which has been found in velvet worms only in the neotropical Peripatidae.

Most genera in this family have only 15 pairs of legs; one genus has 15 or fewer (Regimitra, with 14 or 15 in the only species), and another genus includes only species with fewer than 15 (Ooperipatellus, with 13 or 14, depending on the species). Two genera are characterized by 16 pairs of legs (Occiperipatoides and Paropisthopatus), another genus has 16 or fewer (Peripatoides), and only four genera include velvet worms with more than 16: Opisthopatus (with 16 to 18), Peripatopsis (with 16 to 25), Metaperipatus (with 19 to 22), and Paraperipatus (with 21 to 29). Although leg number is fixed within most peripatopsid species, the four genera that feature more than 16 leg pairs exhibit some variation in leg number within species as well as among species. Peripatopsid species with more legs also feature greater intraspecific variation in leg number.

Distribution
The distribution of the Peripatopsidae (also known as southern velvet worms) is circumaustral; in particular, they inhabit Australasia, South Africa and Chile. Most genera in this family are found in Australia, one genus (Peripatoides) is found in New Zealand, and another (Ooperipatellus) is found in both; two genera (Opisthopatus and Peripatopsis) are found in South Africa, two others (Metaperipatus and Paropisthopatus) are found in Chile, and one other (Paraperipatus) is found in Indonesia and New Guinea.

Genera
The family contains the following genera:

 Acanthokara Reid, 1996
 Aethrikos Reid, 1996
 Aktinothele Reid, 1996
 Anoplokaros Reid, 1996
 Austroperipatus Baehr, 1977
 Baeothele Reid, 1996
 Centrorumis Reid, 1996
 Cephalofovea Ruhberg et al., 1988
 Critolaus Reid, 1996
 Dactylothele Reid, 1996
 Diemenipatus Oliveira, Ruhberg, Rowell & Mayer, 2018
 Dystactotylos Reid, 1996
 Euperipatoides Ruhberg, 1985
 Florelliceps Tait & Norman, 2001
 Hylonomoipos Reid, 1996
 Konothele Reid, 1996
 Kumbadjena Reid, 2002
 Lathropatus Reid, 2000
 Leucopatus (Ruhberg, Mesibov, Briscoe & Tait, 1991)
 Leuropezos Reid, 1996
 Mantonipatus Ruhberg, 1985
 Metaperipatus Clark, 1913
 Minyplanetes Reid, 1996
 Nodocapitus Reid, 1996
 Occiperipatoides Ruhberg, 1985
 Ooperipatellus Ruhberg, 1985
 Ooperipatus Dendy, 1900
 Opisthopatus Purcell, 1899
 Paraperipatus Ruhberg, 1985
 Paropisthopatus Ruhberg, 1985
 Peripatoides Pocock, 1894
 Peripatopsis Pocock, 1894
 Phallocephale Reid, 1996
 Planipapillus Reid, 1996
 Regimitra Reid, 1996
 Ruhbergia Reid, 1996
 Sphenoparme Reid, 1996
 Tasmanipatus Ruhberg et al. 1991
 Tetrameraden Reid, 1996
 Vescerro Reid, 1996
 Wambalana Reid, 1996

References

Onychophoran families
Taxa named by Eugène Louis Bouvier